Blepharomastix cylonalis is a moth in the family Crambidae. It was described by Herbert Druce in 1895. It is found in Guatemala and Panama.

The forewings and hindwings are creamy yellow. The forewings crossed by three and the hindwings by two fine waved brown lines. The marginal line is brown.

References

Moths described in 1895
Blepharomastix